USS Joyance (SP-72) was an armed yacht that served in the United States Navy as a patrol vessel from 1917 to 1919.

Joyance was built as the private steam yacht Cavalier in 1907 by Robert Jacobs at City Island, New York. By the time the U.S. Navy inspected her for possible World War I service—describing her as being of "light construction"—she had been renamed Joyance. The Navy acquired her in May 1917  and commissioned her on 20 July 1917 as USS Joyance (SP-72).

Joyance was assigned to the 3rd Naval District as a harbor patrol boat, and operated in New York Harbor and Long Island Sound during World War I.

Joyance was decommissioned on 6 May 1919 and sold to Reinhard Hall at Brooklyn, New York, on 5 August 1919.

Notes

References

Department of the Navy Naval Historical Center Online Library of Selected Images: Civilian Ships: Joyance (Steam Yacht, 1907); Later USS Joyance (SP-72), 1917-1919
NavSource Online: Patrol Yacht Photo Archive: Joyance (SP 72)

Patrol vessels of the United States Navy
World War I patrol vessels of the United States
Ships built in City Island, Bronx
1907 ships
Steam yachts